Ardekanopsis is a monotypic snout moth genus described by Hans Georg Amsel in 1954. Its one species, also described by Amsel, is Ardekanopsis griseella. It is found in Iran.

References

Anerastiini
Monotypic moth genera
Moths of Asia
Pyralidae genera
Taxa named by Hans Georg Amsel